Otto Ernst Heinrich Klemperer (1899–1987) was a physicist expert in electron optics. He was granted his doctorate by the Humboldt-Universität zu Berlin in 1923. His thesis advisor was Hans Geiger. He continued to work with Geiger in the 1930s.

Klemperer was co-inventor in 1928 of the Geiger-Klemperer ball counter, "the first major advance in the design of proportional counters". During the 1930s, he worked at the Cavendish Laboratory at the University of Cambridge on discrepancies between Fermi's theory of β-decay and the observed radiation properties of rubidium and polonium. He was later an assistant professor and Reader in Physics at Imperial College, London, where he wrote the third edition of his book on electron optics with Mike Barnett.

The conductor Otto Klemperer was his father's cousin.
His uncle was the Romanist Victor Klemperer.

Bibliography

References 

20th-century German physicists
1899 births
1987 deaths
Jewish emigrants from Nazi Germany to the United Kingdom
Academics of Imperial College London
Humboldt University of Berlin alumni
Jewish physicists